Wang Juan may refer to:

 Wang Juan (judoka) (born 1982), Chinese judoka 
 Wang Juan (athlete) (born 1975), Paralympic athlete from China